Gino Armano (25 October 1927 – 29 October 2003) was an Italian footballer who played as a forward. In Alfredo Foni's catenaccio system at Inter, he played as a right winger, essentially acting as a tornante, due to his defensive contribution.

Career
Armano was born in Alessandria. At club level, he began his career with Italian side Alessandria, before moving to Internazionale, where he made 255 appearances between 1948 and 1956, scoring 73 goals, and also served as the team's captain between 1954 and 1956. He won two consecutive Serie A Championships with the club between 1952 and 1954, and was one of the members of Inter's strong attacking line of the 1950s, alongside Lennart Skoglund, Stefano Nyers, and Benito Lorenzi. He later also played for Torino before retiring.

Honours
Alessandria
Serie B: 1945–46

Inter
Serie A: 1952–53, 1953–54

References

External links
Profile at Enciclopediadelcalcio.it

1927 births
2003 deaths
Italian footballers
Association football forwards
Serie A players
Serie B players
Inter Milan players
Torino F.C. players
U.S. Alessandria Calcio 1912 players